Ali-Baba Bound is a 1940 Warner Bros. Looney Tunes cartoon directed by Bob Clampett. The short was released on February 10, 1940, and stars Porky Pig.

The title is a spoof of the song I'm Alabama Bound.

Plot
In the Sahara Desert, where it is so hot even the fan dancers use electric fans, Porky Pig is in the French Foreign Legion.  While leaving a restaurant (known as the Brown Turban) he gets a message from a spy named Tattle Tale Gray that Ali-Baba and his dirty sleeves are going to attack a Beau Geste type desert fort.

Porky is given the task of getting there before the bombing begins. He goes to U-Drive Rent-a-Camel and rents Baby Dumpling the camel, voiced by Dicky Jones, then races off in order to get to the fort.

He gets there, only to discover that all the Legionnaires have gone to the Legion convention in Boston. He is thus alone with Baby Dumpling when Ali-Baba, known as "the mad dog of the desert," decides to attack the fort. After a familiar scenario of gags (one defeated desert warrior marches about with a sign saying, "This fort unfair to Arabs"), Ali-Baba enters the fort and menaces Baby Dumpling, the camel. Baby Dumpling blows a nearby bugle and calls for help.

Back at the rental store, the Mother Camel hears Baby Dumpling's call and begins running into the desert to rescue him and Porky, but then changes course back to the rental store and gets a full tank of water from the nearby filling station. Will a full tank, the Mother Camel races to the fortress and knocks Ali Baba over the fortress wall, saving Porky and Baby Dumpling.

Finally, a suicide warrior (who has been sitting on the bench that says "Reserved for Suicide Squad" with the attackers' secret weapon, a bomb tied to his head) runs toward the fort, intending to blow it up. Porky sees him coming and throws open the fort's front door and he charges through as Mother Camel and Baby Dumpling open the fort's rear door, redirecting him to the oasis, where he runs right into Ali-Baba, turning Ali-Baba and the Dirty Sleeves into tents that are easily sellable. That's all folks!

Trivia 
The cartoon was colorized in both 1968 (redrawn colorization) and 1992 (computer colorization).
In the redrawn colorized version, the Brown Turban is misspelled as, "Brown Lurbon".

See also 
 Looney Tunes and Merrie Melodies filmography (1940–49)

References

External links 
  Content in this article was copied from Ali-Baba Bound at the Looney Tunes wiki, which is licensed under the Creative Commons Attribution-Share Alike 3.0 (Unported) (CC-BY-SA 3.0) license.
 
 

1940 films
1940 animated films
American black-and-white films
Films directed by Bob Clampett
Looney Tunes shorts
Warner Bros. Cartoons animated short films
Films about the French Foreign Legion
Films set in deserts
Porky Pig films
Films scored by Carl Stalling
1940s Warner Bros. animated short films
1940s English-language films